The dusky pademelon or dusky wallaby (Thylogale brunii) is a species of marsupial in the family Macropodidae. It is found in the Aru and Kai islands and the Trans-Fly savanna and grasslands ecoregion of New Guinea. Its natural habitats are subtropical or tropical dry forests, dry savanna, subtropical or tropical dry shrubland, and subtropical or tropical dry lowland grassland. It is threatened by habitat loss.

Names
The scientific name of this pademelon honors Cornelis de Bruijn, the Dutch painter who first described it in the second volume of his Travels, originally published in 1711. There de Bruijn labeled his description with a common name then current, philander (“friend of man”). A later common name was the Aru Island wallaby.

It is known as kutwal (or kotwal) in the Kalam language of Papua New Guinea.

References

External links
 

Macropods
Endemic fauna of New Guinea
Marsupials of New Guinea
Mammals of Western New Guinea
Mammals of Papua New Guinea
Mammals described in 1778
Taxa named by Johann Christian Daniel von Schreber
Taxonomy articles created by Polbot